The 1950 Cal Poly San Dimas Broncos football team represented the Cal Poly Kellogg-Voorhis Unit—now known as California State Polytechnic University, Pomona—as an independent during the 1950 college football season. Led by third-year head coach Duane Whitehead, Cal Poly San Dimas compiled a record of 1–6–1. The team was outscored by its opponents 241 to 75 for the season and was shut out in three of the eight games.

Schedule

Notes

References

Cal Poly San Dimas
Cal Poly Pomona Broncos football seasons
Cal Poly Pomona Broncos football